The crested bunting (Emberiza lathami) is a species of bird in the family Emberizidae.

Distribution and habitat
It is found from the Himalayas eastwards to highland areas of Southeast Asia. Its natural habitat is subtropical or tropical dry lowland grassland.

Gallery

References

External links
Image at ADW 

Emberiza
Birds of the Himalayas
Birds of Eastern Himalaya
Birds of India
Birds of Nepal
Birds of Myanmar
Birds of Thailand
Birds of Laos
Birds of Vietnam
crested bunting
Taxonomy articles created by Polbot
Taxa named by John Edward Gray